Jaromír Dolanský (15 February 1895 – 16 July 1973) was a Czechoslovak communist politician and economist.

Biography
Dolanský was born in to the family of a teacher and philologist. He studied at the Faculty of Law at Charles University in Prague, in between he spent several years on the Russian Eastern Front. In 1922 he joined the Communist Party of Czechoslovakia (KSČ).

He joined the radical, Moscow- and Comintern-oriented group around Klement Gottwald, which later went down in history under the nickname karlínští kluci ("Karlín boys"). At the Fifth Congress of the KSČ in February 1929, these young officials seized power in the KSČ.  He directed the theoretical party magazine Komunistická revue, from about 1938 he was in the leadership of the party. Dolanský was involved in the trade union movement and was secretary of the radical organization Rudé odbory (Red Trade Unions) from 1930 to 1935, from 1935 he was a member of the National Assembly. In 1939 he was arrested while trying to escape from the occupied country and was interned first in the Pankrác prison in Prague, briefly in Dresden and then in the Sachsenhausen concentration camp for five years until the end of the war.

After the end of the war, Dolanský continued his career. From 2 August 1945 he returned to the Central Committee of the Communist Party and on 4 September 1945 he was elected to the Central Committee Presidium. He remained in these high management positions for many years. He worked in the Central Committee Presidium until 15 June 1954, from September 1951 to June 1954, too, he took part in meetings of the Political Secretariat of the Central Committee, then until 8 December 1962 he was a member of the Politburo of the KSČ Central Committee and then until 4 April 1968 again in the Presidium of the Central Committee.

Also immediately after the end of the war, Jaromír Dolanský began his career as a minister in several governments. From 1946 to 1949 he was Minister of Finance in the Klement Gottwald government and in the government of Antonín Zápotocký, then Deputy Prime Minister of the Viliam Široký governments from 1953 to 1963.

Dolanský, together with Jaroslav Kabeš, participated in the preparation of the currency reform of 1953, which removed the savings of the population.

In December 1967 he was amongst the political leaders who were against  the General Secretary of the Communist Party  Antonín Novotný, and voted in favor of his removal. After 1968 he resigned from most posts himself. He was not criticized either during the Prague Spring or during the normalization nor was he party membership revoked.

References

1895 births
1973 deaths
Politicians from Prague
Communist Party of Czechoslovakia politicians
Czechoslovak economists
Czechoslovak lawyers
Members of the Central Committee of the Communist Party of Czechoslovakia
Sachsenhausen concentration camp survivors
Sachsenhausen concentration camp prisoners
Government ministers of Czechoslovakia
Finance ministers of Czechoslovakia
Czechoslovak Comintern people
Members of the Federal Assembly of Czechoslovakia (1969–1971)
Members of the National Assembly of Czechoslovakia (1935–1939)
Charles University alumni